Oriol (also known as Orisol or Orixol) is a mountain located in the Basque Mountains of the Spanish province of Álava. It overlooks the valley of Aramaio.

References

External links
 
 Oriol at the Mendikat website 

Basque Mountains
Mountains of Álava
Mountains of the Basque Country (autonomous community)